Dharmanagar or (Dhôrmônôgôr) is a town with a municipal council in the northeast of India. It is the administrative center for North Tripura district, located in the northernmost region of the state near the Assam border on the west and the India-Bangladesh border on the east. It is the second largest urban area in the state, which make it one of the important commercial centre. The juri river pass through the town.

History
Majority of the known history of Dharmanagar is derived from the ancient Rajmala scripts, which is the ancient Royal chronicles of the Kings of Tripura written in the 14th century.

The origin of the name 'Dharmanagar' cannot be accurately traced back in time. The Rajmala refers to at least four known ancient kings whose names include the word 'Dharma'. So it remains a matter of speculation as to which king had lent his name to the town. Various uncovered documents however, indicate that the existence of Dharmanagar goes back deep into time. The Rajmala further indicates that the name 'Faticuli' was used to mean Dharmanagar back in those ancient times.

Geography 
The exact geographical boundaries of Dharmanagar in the ancient times, have not been clearly documented. However, a general idea about the size obtained from various sources indicate that one major position of Sylhet (now in Bangladesh) was included in Dharmanagar. Sources also indicate that Dharmanagar in those days was not as small as it is today. The size of Dharmanagar has been greatly diminished over the ages and what was once the mighty capital of Tripura has now been reduced to a district town of the state.

At present Dharmanagar is bound by Moulvibazar of Sylhet, Bangladesh in the North, Karimganj district of Assam in the East and Mizoram state in the South and Kailashahar subdivision of Unakoti district in the west.

Demographics

The population of Dharmanagar, as estimated in late 2006, is around 32,912.

Dharmanagar has an average literacy rate of 73.66%, higher than the national average of 65.38%: male literacy is 81.47% and female literacy is 65.41%.

Majority of the population follows Hinduism (92.37%), followed by Islam (6.88%). Buddhism, Christianity, Sikhism and Jainism are followed by less than 1% of the population combined.

Dharmanagar town have a population of 40,595 as per 2011 census. Bengali is spoken by 37,688, Hindi is spoken by 1,085 and 1,822 speaks other languages.

As seen in the table where the population 1991 to 2011 is displayed, Dharmanagar had a population of 25,897 in the year 1991 and it rose to 1.45 in 2001 which stood to 30,790 further more the population had increased more 2.4% in the year 2011 and it went to 40,595

Climate
Dharmanagar is blessed with a peaceful climate most of the year. However, summer time can be excessively hot, dry, humid and interspersed with rains and thunderstorms. Winter generally starts towards the end of November and lasts until February, where the temperatures can reach very low conditions. The monsoon season in Dharmanagar starts in April during the Bengali month of Baishakh. During the monsoon season, Dharmanagar is inundated frequently due to excessive rainfall and flooding by the local rivers.

Transport

The nearest airport to Dharmanagar is in Silchar and airfield at Agartala. There is also a helipad for helicopter rides or for quick journeys to the capital Agartala. Kailashahar Airport was the nearest airport to the city but it is currently non-active and abandoned. Recently the AAI surveyed the zone and has agreed to invest in upgrading the abandoned airport there. The state government has also agreed to acquire 79 acres to support this project.

Daily bus service runs from Dharmanagar to Shillong and Guwahati via NH 8. Bus services to nearby cities of Assam and Tripura from Dharmanagar ISBT are more frequent. Buses also connect Dharmanagar to state capital. Connectivity via bus is one of the most important forms of transportation for local residents.

The city has good train connectivity from Dharmanagar railway station. Daily multiple passenger trains run from Dharmanagar to Assam and state capital Agartala. Agartala is connected to rest of India through the lines of Dharmanagar. On 2008 Agartala became the second capital of Northeast India to get connected to railway network. Tripurasundari Express, Rajdhani Express, Kanchanjunga Express, Humsafar Express, Habibganj Express, Secunderabad Express, Deogarh Express connects Dharmanagar with cities like Firozpur, Delhi, Kolkata, Bangalore, Bhopal, Hyderabad, Deogarh (Jharkhand) respectively.

Education

There are eight higher secondary schools in Dharmanagar. Padmapur HS School, Bir Bikram Institution, DMR Girls Higher Secondary School, DNV, Chandrapur,  Nayapara, Rajbari, Golden Valley H.S (+2 Stage) School, Holy Cross, North Point School, and Siksha Bhavan Montessori School, last four are fully taught in English language. There's also a degree college which is called Dharmanagar Govt. Degree College. It has been graded by NAAC and is the highest ranked degree college in Tripura. Siksha Bhavan Montessori School is the Education Partner of TATA Interactive Systems and North Point School is the Education partner of MEXUS Education Pvt. Ltd. for providing Digital classes for the students. The school using the Digital Class System 'Class Edge' brand from the TATA Interactive Systems.

{BY SAMARJIT BARMAN, DNV in Form./ID:Work Education., GPRS cell No. 8974168219

INDIA- Constitution of India:-

Rule (a)): Samarjit Barman is the IPS 2 in Dharmanagar in all a name a 1987 in Work Education in dot so a 1984 is a STK in it a cell in spice in it.

Rule (b): A name is a all in a Bapi in Dev in so a BD is the TSECL's bill a oval so in name a USA only in oval ID.

Address:- House No. ROR-147/2017, Officetilla, Dharmanagar - 799250, Tripura, India}

NGOs
Growing Seed: It's a social welfare organization established in 2011 with the aspiration to influence the society in a positive manner. Initially, it was formed by a bunch of school students who, during their vacation days, thought to do something for the society. Since then the organization has been working continuously for the betterment of the environment as well as for the people. It believes in dynamic and youthful work culture, and their working field is diverse, ranging from medical awareness to agriculture and farmer's development, from conciliation of scientific temper to nurturing of local culture, tradition, and literature. The core committee members are youth professionals from assorted professional backgrounds. This resourcefulness and diversity have enabled the NGO to rise as one of the youngest yet highly active non-governmental social welfare organization. For more details, please visit 
 Rotaract Club of Dharmanagar*: The Rotaract Club of Dharmanagar is a Non profitable Organisation, The club has been established in the year 2019
Swapnochowa: It is a voluntary organization of several like-minded youth who think about the social problems and want to do something for the country keeping the values of the patriotic & communal harmony in their mind and heart. Established in 2019 they believe that if they all work together for the betterment of the country through some small steps, they can change the lives of many people. They can enlighten the country as a spark of Light.

 Lions Club: Lions Club, Dharmanagar is one of the leading NGO's in the township. They have many permanent projects like Ambulance service, Oxygen service, drinking water projects etc. Their outstanding project is Lions Children Park which is one of the best parks in Tripura.

Neighbouring Towns and Cities 
North Tripura

Panisagar

Unakoti
 Kailashahar
 Kumarghat

West Tripura
 Agartala
 Khowai

South Tripura
 Udaipur
 Belonia

Dhalai
 Kamalpur
 Ambassa

Outer Tripura
 Silchar
 Karimganj
 Kolkata
 Shillong

Local Sights and Attractions

Durga Puja Festival

During the Durga Puja Festival, the streets come alive and people from the entire town come to the town centre to visit the many statues of goddess Durga scattered around the town. Durga Puja is an annual Hindu festival that celebrates worship of the Hindu goddess Durga. It refers to all the six days observed as Mahalaya, Shashthi, Saptami, Ashtami, Navami and Bijoya Dashami.

The Durga pandals of Dharmanagar secured second place in the Maa Durga contest;  after the Capital City of Tripura Agartala.

Kali Puja Festival
One of the main festivals is the Kali Puja which occurs between September and October. Dharmanagar is also known for its bright lights during this Puja where the entire town is lit up.

Dighi, Shops, Markets and Temples
The playgrounds (BBI & DNV), shopping mall (Rana Plaza), Vishal Mega Mart, City life, Reliance Trends, Bazar India. Temples like Kalibari, Hari mandir, Office Tilla Kalibari, Shib Bari, Ramakrishna Seba Samiti, Choto Kalibari are tourist attractions.

Unakoti
A short distance away is the ancient site of Unakoti, which literally means "one less a crore" in Bengali, hosts an ancient place of worship with huge rock-cut images and stone idols of Lord Shiva. It is the prime tourist spot of North Tripura District, and is located in the neighbouring town of Kailashahar Subdivision in the North-eastern Indian state of Tripura.

Politics
Dharmanagar is a part of Tripura East (Lok Sabha constituency). The Deputy Speaker of Tripura Legislative Assembly Biswa Bandhu Sen represents the Dharmanagar constituency.

Media & communications

Radio
 All India Radio
 Akashvani (On AM).

Newspapers
No daily newspaper is published from Dharmanagar, except a few weekly. Daily newspapers published from Agartala, Karimganj and Silchar reaches daily morning in this town. Besides above, national dailies like The Telegraph, Anandabazar Patrika, Dainik Sambad, Bartaman, The Times of India, The Statesman, Hindustan Times etc. are also available.

See also
 List of cities and towns in Tripura

References

External links
 
 JantaReview Dharmanagar Guide

Cities and towns in North Tripura district
North Tripura district